Glenwood, West Virginia may refer to:
Glenwood, Mason County, West Virginia, an unincorporated community in Mason County
Glenwood, Mercer County, West Virginia, an unincorporated community in Mercer County